Mehdi Tajik (born March 11, 1979) is an Iranian Football player who currently plays for Paykan of the Iran Pro League.

Club career

Club career statistics
Last Update  30 September 2010 

 Assist Goals

References

1979 births
Living people
Iranian footballers
Paykan F.C. players
Association football defenders